Manchester High School is a high school located in the unincorporated town of Midlothian in Chesterfield County, Virginia, United States.

The school is a part of Chesterfield County Public Schools.

History
In 1914, three schools consolidated to form Elkhardt School (eventually Elkhardt Middle School) at 6300 Hull Street Road, which had a faculty of four, including the principal. In 1916, the first public transportation to the school was provided by horse-drawn wagon. The name was changed to Manchester District High School in 1924, with the first graduating class, in 1925, consisting of eight students. Rapid population growth, following World War II, required that new facilities be built, and in fall 1964 the school was moved to 7401 Hull Street Road (now Manchester Middle School). Westward urban sprawl from the nearby city of Richmond, Virginia, required yet another move in 1992 to the current location at 12601 Bailey Bridge Road.

Campus
Manchester shares many of its facilities with the adjacent Bailey Bridge Middle School. It is home to Lloyd Swelnis Stadium, named after the long-time Manchester athletic director. In 2003 closed-circuit cameras were installed in the building and parking lots to provide better security for students and staff. An addition to the main building was completed in 2004 to house the Mass Communications and Spanish-Immersion Specialty Centers.

Students
Manchester High School has a diverse student body, consisting of approximately 1900 students, and is reflective of the multiple ethnicities present in Chesterfield County. The opening of Cosby High School in 2006, and the new location and recreation of Clover Hill High School has alleviated the over-crowding at Manchester High, allowing for the reduction in number of trailers previously used as classrooms.

Activities
Sports teams include baseball, basketball, football, cheerleading, volleyball, soccer, softball, field hockey, track and field, cross-country, tennis, wrestling, and golf. Notable clubs include a JROTC program, Foreign Language clubs, school news paper, Model UN, show choir, marching band, Red Cross and cheering. There is also a Mass communication and Spanish Immersion specialty center.

In 2018, Manchester High School won the Class 6 Virginia State Championship in Football.

Notable alumni

DaShaun Amos - professional American football player (class of 2012)
Kavell Conner – professional football player (San Diego Chargers) (class of 2004)
Pearce Paul Creasman - professor of archaeology, Egyptology and dendrochronology (class of 2000); world junior champion, triathlon (2001-2002)
Denny Hamlin – NASCAR driver (class of 1999)
Domonic Jones – expatriate professional basketball player (class of 2000)
Dick Lines – former professional baseball player (Washington Senators)
Sean Marshall – professional baseball player (Cincinnati Reds) (class of 2001)
Rada Owen – swimming coach and former competition swimmer

References

Public high schools in Virginia
Educational institutions established in 1924
Schools in Chesterfield County, Virginia
Chesterfield County Public Schools
1924 establishments in Virginia